Voice 2: Cover Lovers Rock is the second cover album by the J-pop singer Tomiko Van.

Track listing
  (Spitz)
  (Masayoshi Yamazaki)
 "You're the Only・・" (Masatoshi Ono)
  (Naotaro Moriyama)
 "It's Only Love" (Masaharu Fukuyama)
  (Noriyuki Makihara)
 "Oh My Little Girl" (Yutaka Ozaki)
  (Tulip)
 "Zoo" (Kaori Kawamura)
  (The Kaleidoscope)
 Oh, Pretty Woman (Roy Orbison)

Chart positions

References

2008 albums
Tomiko Van albums
Covers albums